Arbérats-Sillègue is a commune in the Pyrénées-Atlantiques department in the Nouvelle-Aquitaine region of southwestern France.

The inhabitants of the commune are known as Arberaztar in Basque.

Geography
Arbérats-Sillègue is located in Mixe Country in the former Basque province of Lower Navarre, 3 km north-east of Saint-Palais and 10 km south-west of Sauveterre-de-Béarn. The D933 road from Saint-Palais to Osserain-Rivareyte in the north passes through the northern part of the commune. The D134 road passes through the east of the commune from Sussaute in the north continuing south to join the D11 road west of Domezain-Berraute. Access to the village is by country road from the western border passing through the village and going east to join the D134.

The commune is located in the Drainage basin of the Adour. The Ruisseau de Recaide forms  part of the northern border flowing north-west to join the Bidouze. The Ruisseau d'Eyherachar rises north-east of the village and flows west through the commune then south forming part of the western border before joining the Bidouze just south of Aïcirits (Aïcirits-Camou-Suhast).

Historical places and hamlets

 Aguerre
 Aitciria
 Amandania
 Apezetchia
 Arbérats
 Beheitia
 Bentaberria
 Bidegorria
 Bilhagnia
 Bitenia
 Brigni
 Chibits
 Chiloa
 Chunta
 Elhorriburia
 Etcheparia
 Idiartia
 Iratzia
 Irunia
 Jemai
 Mendiburia
 Michicourt
 Mignaburia
 Osquilia
 Oxarrainia
 Oxarrainia Etchartia
 Oyhanto
 Peritcho
 Salanbeheria
 Sillègue

Toponymy
The name of the commune in basque is Arberatze-Zilhekoa. Paul Raymond indicated on page 161 of his 1863 dictionary that Sillègue in Basque was Silhecoa.

Jean-Baptiste Orpustan suggested two possible origins of the name Arbérats, both from Basque: ar(r)-bera (or ) meaning ’fragile’ or ’friable'; or, together with the word , meaning a "black stone" (slate). Brigitte Jobbé-Duval also interpreted Arbérats as place of slate.

For Sillègue Jean-Batiste Orpustan suggested the name  was a blend of the Basque word zil(h)o, meaning "hole" or "depression in the terrain" and a second element leku meaning "place".

The following table details the origins of the commune name and other names in the commune.

Sources:
Orpustan: Jean-Baptiste Orpustan,   New Basque Toponymy
Raymond: Topographic Dictionary of the Department of Basses-Pyrenees, 1863, on the page numbers indicated in the table. 
Cassini1: 
Cassini2: 

Origins:
Duchesne: Duchesne collection volume CXIV
Ohix:
Pamplona: Titles of Pamplona
Notaries: Notaries of Labastide-Villefranche
Regulations: Regulations of the Court of Licharre

History
The village of Sillègue was merged with Arbérats on 14 April 1841.

Heraldry

Administration

List of Successive Mayors

Inter-communality
The commune belongs to five inter-communal structures:
the Communauté d'agglomération du Pays Basque;
the energy syndicate of Pyrénées-Atlantiques;
the Inter-communal association for the functioning of schools in Amikuze;
the Syndicat Elgarrekin Ikas;
the Agence publique de gestion locale.

Demography
In 1350 there were 13 fires in Arbérats and 6 in Sillègue.

The fiscal census of 1412–1413, made on the orders of Charles III of Navarre, compared with that of 1551 "of men and weapons that are in this Kingdom of Navarre below the ports" reveals a demography with strong growth. The first indicated the presence at Arbérats of 7 fires, the second of 26 (24 + 2 secondary fires). The same for Sillègue: the 1412 census reported 5 fires and that of 1551 22 fires (20 + 2 secondary fires).
 
The census of the population of Lower Navarre in 1695 showed 40 fires at Arbérats and 20 at Sillègues.

In 2017 the commune had 257 inhabitants. Although from 1793 to 1836 Arbérats and Sillègue were separate communes, the total population for both communes is shown in the table and graph below.

Economy
The commune is part of the Appellation d'origine contrôlée of Ossau-iraty.

Culture and Heritage
According to the Map of the Seven Basque Provinces published in 1863 by Prince Louis-Lucien Bonaparte the Basque dialect spoken in Arbérats-Sillègue is western lower-navarrese.

Religious heritage
The Church of Saint-Laurent (1615) is registered as an historical monument.

Facilities

Education
The commune has an elementary school

Festivals
The commune has a festival hall located in the centre of the village. The original building was a school and has been completely renovated.

Sports
As it was only equipped with a left wall, Arbérats-Sillègue in 2007 opened a new fronton with toilets and a Pétanque area. There is also a football field in the same complex.

Leisure
A pit dating to Roman times has been converted to a leisure park.

See also
Communes of the Pyrénées-Atlantiques department

References

External links
Arbérats-Sillègue on Géoportail, National Geographic Institute (IGN) website 
Arberats and Sillegue on the 1750 Cassini Map

Communes of Pyrénées-Atlantiques
Lower Navarre